Avengers: Endgame is the fourth Avengers film and the 22nd film in the Marvel Cinematic Universe (MCU), released seven years after the first Avengers film and eleven years after the first MCU film. Directed by Anthony and Joe Russo, the film features an ensemble cast of actors reprising their roles from previous entries in the MCU.

Endgame was released in April 2019 and went on to break numerous box office records in various markets. Worldwide, it set the record for highest-grossing film of all time, the highest opening weekend gross, and the fastest cumulative grosses through $2.5 billion. In its domestic market of the US and Canada, it set the records for the highest-grossing opening weekend, single day, Friday, Saturday, and Sunday as well as the fastest cumulative grosses through $650 million. Elsewhere, it became the highest-grossing film of all time in several markets including Chile and Thailand, set the record for highest opening weekend gross in more than 40 markets including Australia, Brazil, China, Egypt, Mexico, and the United Kingdom, and set various IMAX records in 50 different markets across all six inhabited continents. Many of the records set by the film are listed below. Data on the previous record and records that have since been surpassed are presented where available and applicable. All grosses are given in unadjusted US dollars, except where noted otherwise.

Worldwide 
Worldwide, Endgame grossed more money faster than any previous film. It also set the records for the highest-grossing opening weekend in total as well as in the IMAX and 3D formats.

United States and Canada 
In its domestic market of the US and Canada, Endgame set records for highest-grossing opening weekend and the fastest cumulative grosses through $650 million. It also set several single-day records and had the widest opening and release to date.

Other territories 
The film became the highest-grossing film in several markets in South America and Asia. It also set various opening records in over 50 markets across all six continents (not counting Antarctica). Data on precise figures, previous record holders, and surpassed records is limited due to the absence of box office record trackers for these markets.

See also
List of box office records set by Avengers: Infinity War
 List of highest-grossing films
 List of fastest-grossing films
List of highest-grossing superhero films
 United States box office records

References

External links
List of records as of the opening weekend at Deadline Hollywood

Box office records set by Avengers: Endgame
Avengers: Endgame
Avengers: Endgame box office
Avengers: Endgame box office
Avengers: Endgame box office